Ivan Lyudvigovich Knunyants (– 21 December 1990), was a Soviet chemist of Armenian origin, academician of the Academy of Sciences of the Soviet Union, a major general and engineer, who significantly contributed to the advancement of Soviet chemistry. He made more than 200 inventions, many of which used in the Soviet industry. 

Graduated from Moscow Bauman Highest Technical School (MVTU) 1928, student of Aleksei Chichibabin. Leader of laboratory for elementooranic chemistry.

He was one of the pioneers of the synthesis of poly-caprolactam (capron, nylon-6, polyamide-6), founder of Soviet school of fluorocarbon's chemistry, one of major developers of Soviet chemical weapons program, also an author of a few drugs for chemotherapy of cancer.

He proposed the method of getting the 5-hydroxypentan-2-one from ethyl ethanoate and oxirane, also used in the industrial synthesis of vitamin B. His scientific group synthesized compounds containing fluorine, along with nitro-, amino-hydroxy-isoquinoline-air and other groups.

Awards 
 Hero of Socialist Labour (1966)
 Order of Lenin (1966)
 Lenin Prize (1972)
 Three Stalin Prizes (1943, 1948 and 1950)
 Order of the October Revolution
 Order of the Red Banner
 Order of the Red Banner of Labour
 Order of the Red Star

See also 
 List of Russian inventors

References
 Biography
 I.L. Knunyants Laboratory at Korovy Brod, Chemistry and Life, N6, 1981
 Knunyants entry on the All-Russia Genealogical Tree site
 Ivan Knunyants on warheroes.ru

1906 births
1990 deaths
20th-century Russian chemists
Scientists from Shusha
Communist Party of the Soviet Union members
Bauman Moscow State Technical University alumni
Kyiv Polytechnic Institute alumni
Full Members of the USSR Academy of Sciences
Heroes of Socialist Labour
Stalin Prize winners
Lenin Prize winners
Recipients of the Order of Lenin
Recipients of the Order of the Red Banner
Recipients of the Order of the Red Banner of Labour
Recipients of the Order of the Red Star
Polymer scientists and engineers
Armenian chemists
Russian chemists
Russian major generals
Soviet Armenians
Soviet chemists
Soviet major generals
Burials at Novodevichy Cemetery